Dragichevo is a village in Southern Bulgaria. The village is located in Pernik Municipality, Pernik Province. Аccording to the numbers provided by the 2020 Bulgarian census, Dragichevo currently has a population of 2149 people with a permanent address registration in the settlement.

Geography and Culture 
Dragichevo is situated at the foot of Lyulin mountain, at an elevation if 740 meters. There are four quarters in the village - Kalinitsa, Rekata, Garata, and Rudarska.

History 
The first mention of Dragichevo village dates back to 1715. There are records of a village called Dragishchuva in its location from 1420. Afterwards, the name changes to Dragidzhuva in 1576 and to Dragichevo in 1728.

Buildings and Infrastructure 
The infrastructure of the village is very well developed as many of the people settled there live and work in Sofia and Pernik. There is public transport, although the village is polluted due to it.

Buildings

 The church “Uspenie Bogorodichno” was built in 1862
 The local school dates back to 1895.
 The local community hall and library was built in 1922.

Ethnicity 
According to the Bulgarian population census in 2011.

References 

Villages in Pernik Province